The  or  are a kind of devotional and paraliturgical songs of Iberian origin typical of Sardinia, and written in the Sardinian language.

Etymology 
Both  and  seem to originate in turn from the Latin  meaning "joy" or "delight".

A minor denomination comes from the Catalan  (strophe), called gròbbes or cròbbes, which also comprise some other genres related to the improvised poetry in some areas around Nuoro, and especially where the conventional boundaries of the Logudorese and Campidanese dialects merge.

The gosos in Sardinia 
The  include religious pieces of music in the Sardinian language and all its dialects, following a rhyme scheme based on the octave, sestina and quintain.

According to the scholar , the roots of the Sardinian  actually lie in the Byzantine models: they are in fact identical to the Greek kontakion in terms of the metre structure and the strophes with the chorus at the end. It is also known from the De cerimoniis aulae Byzantinae that the protospatharios Torchitorio I, in honor of the Emperor Constantine VII Porphyrogenitus, sent a delegation of Sardinians who sang a peculiar Greek hymn in Constantinople. Some other authors think that the  derive from the Italian lauda, which made its way to Sardinia and the other regions of Europe thanks to Saint Francis' spiritual influence; it has also been theorised that the  style of singing might actually be of autochthonous origin, with sonorities typical of the ancient Mediterranean region.

Some pieces written in Spanish have also been saved, such as the one in the parish of Sedilo by Jaime Zonquelo Espada, who composed the Gosos de la Virgen de la Piedad in 1734.

The following years also saw the  being declared illegal, in accordance with a series of policies that favoured cultural assimilation to Italian and discouraged the use of the non-Italian dialects and languages, Sardinian included.

Collections 
The most ancient  text known is the collection of the Laudes a sa Rejna de sa Rosa. Said collection by Ferraro has 37  transcribed, some of them being reported in the single local varieties, and all of them reporting the name of whoever collected them first.

In 2004, the diocese of Nuoro released a collection of  edited by the priests Giovanni Carta and Pietro Muggianu, with one hundred or so  that were scattered across the various parishes of central Sardinia.

See also 
 Music of Sardinia

Notes

References

Further reading 
  (translated into Italian by Raffa Garzia as )
 Dore, Giovanni (1983). Gosos e ternuras : testi e musiche religiose popolari sarde secondo l'antica e ininterrotta tradizione di pregare cantando, Istituto superiore regionale etnografico, Nuoro.
 (Ed. by Sara Chirra and Maria Grazia Farris, 2002). Laudes immortales : gosos e devozione mariana in Sardegna, Grafica del Parteolla, Dolianova.
 Licheri, Bonaventura (edited by Mario Cubeddu, 2016). Gaudia : gosos e lodi sacre, Ilisso, Nuoro.

External links 
 
 

Genres of poetry
Song forms
Music in Sardinia